Erythrolamprus lamonae is a species of snake in the family Colubridae. The species is found in Colombia and Ecuador.

References

Erythrolamprus
Reptiles of Colombia
Reptiles of Ecuador
Reptiles described in 1944
Taxa named by Emmett Reid Dunn